Saturday in the Park may refer to:

"Saturday in the Park" (song), a 1972 single by the band Chicago
Saturday in the Park (music festival), a music festival in Sioux City, Iowa